Religious violence covers phenomena in which religion is either the subject or the object of violent behavior. All the religions of the world contain narratives, symbols, and metaphors of violence and war. Religious violence is violence that is motivated by, or in reaction to, religious precepts, texts, or the doctrines of a target or an attacker. It includes violence against religious institutions, people, objects, or events. Religious violence does not exclusively include acts which are committed by religious groups, instead, it includes acts which are committed against religious groups.

"Violence" is a very broad concept which is difficult to define because it is used against both human and non-human objects. Furthermore, the term can denote a wide variety of experiences such as blood shedding, physical harm, forcing against personal freedom, passionate conduct or language, or emotions such as fury and passion.

"Religion" is a complex and problematic modern western concept. Though there is no scholarly consensus over what a religion is, today, religion is generally considered an abstraction which entails beliefs, doctrines, and sacred places. The link between religious belief and behavior is problematic. Decades of anthropological, sociological, and psychological research have all proven the falsehood of the assumption that behaviors directly follow from religious beliefs and values because people's religious ideas are fragmented, loosely connected, and context-dependent just like all other domains of culture and life. In general, religions, ethical systems, and societies rarely promote violence as an end in itself since violence is universally undesirable. At the same time, there is a universal tension between the general desire to avoid violence and the acceptance of justifiable uses of violence to prevent a "greater evil" that permeates all cultures.

Religious violence, like all forms of violence, is a cultural process which is context-dependent and very complex. Oversimplifications of "religion" and "violence" often lead to misguided understandings of causes for why some people commit acts of violence and why most people never commit such acts in the first place. Violence is perpetrated for a wide variety of ideological reasons and religion is generally only one of many contributing social and political factors that can lead to unrest. Studies of supposed cases of religious violence often conclude that violence is strongly driven by ethnic animosities rather than by religious worldviews. Due to the complex nature of religion and violence and the complex relationship which exists between them, it is normally unclear if religion is a significant cause of violence.

History of the concept of religion

Religion is a modern Western concept. The compartmentalized concept of religion, where religious things were separated from worldly things, was not used before the 1500s. Furthermore, parallel concepts are not found in many cultures and there is no equivalent term for "religion" in many languages. Scholars have found it difficult to develop a consistent definition, with some giving up on the possibility of a definition and others rejecting the term entirely. Others argue that regardless of its definition, it is not appropriate to apply it to non-Western cultures.

The modern concept of "religion" as an abstraction which entails distinct sets of beliefs or doctrines is a recent invention in the English language since such usage began with texts from the 17th century due to the splitting of Christendom during the Protestant Reformation and more prevalent colonization or globalization in the age of exploration which involved contact with numerous foreign and indigenous cultures with non-European languages.

Ancient sacred texts like the Bible and the Quran did not have a concept of religion in their original languages and neither did their authors or the cultures to which they belonged.
It was in the 19th century that the terms "Buddhism", "Hinduism", "Taoism", and "Confucianism" first emerged.

There is no precise equivalent of "religion" in Hebrew, and Judaism does not draw clear distinctions between religious, national, racial, or ethnic identities.

Definition of violence

Violence is difficult to define because the term is a complicated concept which broadly carries descriptive and evaluative components which range from harming non-human objects to human self-harm. Ralph Tanner cites the definition of violence in the Oxford English Dictionary as "far beyond (the infliction of) pain and the shedding of blood." He argues that, although violence clearly encompasses injury to persons or property, it also includes "the forcible interference in personal freedom, violent or passionate conduct or language (and) finally passion or fury."
Similarly, Abhijit Nayak writes:
The word "violence" can be defined to extend far beyond pain and shedding blood. It carries the meaning of physical force, violent language, fury, and, more importantly, forcible interference.

Terence Fretheim writes:
For many people, ... only physical violence truly qualifies as violence. But, certainly, violence is more than killing people, unless one includes all those words and actions that kill people slowly. The effect of limitation to a “killing fields” perspective is the widespread neglect of many other forms of violence. We must insist that violence also refers to that which is psychologically destructive, that which demeans, damages, or depersonalizes others. In view of these considerations, violence may be defined as follows: any action, verbal or nonverbal, oral or written, physical or psychical, active or passive, public or private, individual or institutional/societal, human or divine, in whatever degree of intensity, that abuses, violates, injures, or kills. Some of the most pervasive and most dangerous forms of violence are those that are often hidden from view (against women and children, especially); just beneath the surface in many of our homes, churches, and communities is abuse enough to freeze the
blood. Moreover, many forms of systemic violence often slip past our attention because they are so much a part of the infrastructure of life (e.g., racism, sexism, ageism).

Relationship between religion and violence
According to Steve Clarke, "currently available evidence does not allow us to determine whether religion is, or is not, a significant cause of violence." He lists multiple problems that make it impossible to establish a causal relationship such as difficulties in distinguishing motive/pretext and inability to verify if they would necessarily lead to any violent action, the lack of consensus of definitions of both violence and religion among scholars, and the inability to see if the presence of religion actually adds or subtracts from general levels of violence since no society without religion has ever existed to compare with.

Charles Selengut characterizes the phrase "religion and violence" as "jarring", asserting that "religion is thought to be opposed to violence and a force for peace and reconciliation." He acknowledges, however, that "the history and scriptures of the world's religions tell stories of violence and war even as they speak of peace and love."

According to Matthew Rowley, three hundred contributing causes of religious violence have been discussed by some scholars, however, he states that "violence in the name of God is a complex phenomenon and oversimplification further jeopardizes peace because it obscures many of the causal factors." In another piece, Matthew Rowley lists 15 ways to address the complexity of violence, both secular and religious, and he also states that secular narratives of religious violence tend to be erroneous or exaggerated due to their over simplification of religious people, their oversimplification of religious people's beliefs, their thinking which is based on false dichotomies, and their ignorance of complex secular causes of supposed "religious violence". He also states that when one is discussing religious violence, he or she should also note that the overwhelming majority of religious people do not get inspired to engage in violence.

Similarly, Ralph Tanner describes the combination of religion and violence as "uncomfortable", asserting that religious thinkers generally avoid the conjunction of the two and argue that religious violence is "only valid in certain circumstances which are invariably one-sided".

Michael Jerryson argues that scholarship on religion and violence sometimes overlooks non-Abrahamic religions. This tendency leads to considerable problems, one of which is the support of faulty associations. For example, he finds a persistent global pattern of alignment in which religions such as Islam are viewed as causes of violence and religions such as Buddhism are viewed as causes of peace.

In many instances of political violence, religion tends to play a central role. This is especially true of terrorism, in which acts of violence are committed against unarmed noncombatants in order to inspire fear and achieve political goals. Terrorism expert Martha Crenshaw suggests that religion is just a mask which is used by political movements which seek to draw attention to their causes and gain support. Crenshaw outlines two approaches when she observes religious violence in order to view its underlying mechanisms. One approach, called the instrumental approach, sees religious violence as acting as a rational calculation to achieve some political end. Increasing the costs of performing such violence will help curb it. Crenshaw's alternate approach sees religious violence stemming from the organizational structure of religious communities, with the heads of these communities acting as political figureheads. Crenshaw suggests that threatening the internal stability of these organizations (perhaps by offering them a nonviolent alternative) will dissuade religious organizations from performing political violence. A third approach sees religious violence as the result of community dynamics rather than a religious duty. Systems of meanings which are developed within these communities allow religious interpretations to justify violence, so acts like terrorism occur because people are part of communities of violence. In this way, religious violence and terrorism are performances which are designed to inspire an emotional reaction from both those in the community and those outside of it.

Hector Avalos argues that religions cause violence over four scarce resources: access to divine will, knowledge, primarily through scripture; sacred space; group privileging; and salvation. Not all religions have or use these four resources. He believes that religious violence is particularly untenable because these resources are never verifiable and, unlike claims to scarce resources such as water or land, it cannot be adjudicated objectively.

Regina Schwartz argues that all monotheistic religions are inherently violent because of an exclusivism that inevitably fosters violence against those that are considered outsiders.  Lawrence Wechsler asserts that Schwartz isn't just arguing that Abrahamic religions have a violent legacy, she is arguing that their legacy is genocidal in nature.

Challenges to the view that religions are violent

Behavioral studies

Decades of research which was conducted by social scientists have established that "religious congruence" (the assumption that religious beliefs and values are tightly integrated in an individual's mind or that religious practices and behaviors follow directly from religious beliefs or that religious beliefs are chronologically linear and stable across different contexts) is actually rare. People's religious ideas are fragmented, loosely connected, and context-dependent, as in all other domains of culture and in life. The beliefs, affiliations, and behaviors of any individual are complex activities that have many sources including culture.

Myth of religious violence

Others such as William Cavanaugh have argued that it is unreasonable to attempt to differentiate "religious violence" from "secular violence" by classifying them as separate categories of violence. Cavanaugh asserts that "the idea that religion has a tendency to promote violence is part of the conventional wisdom of Western societies and it underlies many of our institutions and policies, from limits on the public role of churches to efforts to promote liberal democracy in the Middle East." Cavanaugh challenges this conventional wisdom, arguing that there is a "myth of religious violence", basing his argument on the assertion that "attempts to separate religious and secular violence are incoherent".

Cavanaugh asserts:

 Religion is not a universal and transhistorical phenomenon. What counts as "religious" or "secular" in any context is a function of configurations of power both in the West and lands colonized by the West. The distinctions of "Religious/Secular" and "Religious/Political" are modern Western inventions.
 The invention of the concept of "religious violence" helps the West reinforce superiority of Western social orders to "nonsecular" social orders, namely Muslims at the time of publication.
 The concept of "religious violence" can be and is used to legitimate violence against non-Western "Others".
 Peace depends on a balanced view of violence and recognition that so-called secular ideologies and institutions can be just as prone to absolutism, divisiveness, and irrationality.

Jeffrey Russell argues that numerous cases of supposed acts of religious violence such as the Thirty Years War, the French Wars of Religion, the Protestant-Catholic conflict in Ireland, the Sri Lankan Civil War, and the Rwandan Civil War were all primarily motivated by social, political, and economic issues rather than religion.

John Morreall and Tamara Sonn have argued that all cases of violence and war include social, political, and economic dimensions. Since there is no consensus on definitions of "religion" among scholars and since there is no way to isolate "religion" from the rest of the more likely motivational dimensions, it is incorrect to label any violent event as "religious". They state that since dozens of examples exist from the European wars of religion that show that people from the same religions fought each other and that people from different religions became allies during these conflicts, the motivations for these conflicts were not about religion. Jeffrey Burton Russell has argued that the fact that these wars of religion ended after rulers agreed to practice their religions in their own territories, means that the conflicts were more related to political control than about people's religious views.

According to Karen Armstrong, so-called religious conflicts such as the Crusades, the Spanish Inquisition, and the European wars of religion, were all deeply political conflicts at their cores, rather than religious ones. Especially since people from different faiths constantly became allies and fought against each other in no consistent fashion. She states that the Western concept of the separation of church and state, which was first advocated by the Reformer Martin Luther, laid a foundation for viewing religion and society as being divided when in reality, religion and society were intermixed to the point that no one made such a distinction nor was there a defining cut between such experiences in the past. During the Enlightenment, religion began to be seen as an individualistic and private thing despite the fact that modern secular ideals like the equality of all human beings, intellectual and political liberty were things that were historically promoted in a religious idiom in the past.

Anthropologist Jack David Eller asserts that religion is not inherently violent, arguing "religion and violence are clearly compatible, but they are not identical." He asserts that "violence is neither essential to nor exclusive to religion" and that " virtually every form of religious violence has its nonreligious corollary." Moreover, he argues that religion "may be more a marker of the [conflicting] groups than an actual point of contention between them".
John Teehan takes a position that integrates the two opposing sides of this debate. He describes the traditional response in defense of religion as "draw(ing) a distinction between the religion and what is done in the name of that religion or its faithful." Teehan argues, "this approach to religious violence may be understandable but it is ultimately untenable and prevents us from gaining any useful insight into either religion or religious violence." He takes the position that "violence done in the name of religion is not a perversion of religious belief... but flows naturally from the moral logic inherent in many religious systems, particularly monotheistic religions...." However, Teehan acknowledges that "religions are also powerful sources of morality." He asserts, "religious morality and religious violence both spring from the same source, and this is the evolutionary psychology underlying religious ethics."

Historians such as Jonathan Kirsch have made links between the European inquisitions, for example, and Stalin's persecutions in the Soviet Union, Nazi Germany, McCarthy blacklists, and other secular events as being the same type of phenomenon as the inquisitions.

Others, such as Robert Pape, a political scientist who specializes in suicide terrorism, have made a case for secular motivations and reasons as being foundations of most suicide attacks that are oftentimes labeled as "religious". Pape compiled the first complete database of every documented suicide bombing during 1980–2003. He argues that the news reports about suicide attacks are profoundly misleading — "There is little connection between suicide terrorism and Islamic fundamentalism, or any one of the world's religions". After studying 315 suicide attacks carried out over the last two decades, he concludes that suicide bombers' actions stem fundamentally from political conflict, not religion.

Secularism as a response

Byron Bland asserts that one of the most prominent reasons for the "rise of the secular in Western thought" was the reaction against the religious violence of the 16th and 17th centuries. He asserts that "(t)he secular was a way of living with the religious differences that had produced so much horror. Under secularity, political entities have a warrant to make decisions independent from the need to enforce particular versions of religious orthodoxy. Indeed, they may run counter to certain strongly held beliefs if made in the interest of common welfare. Thus, one of the important goals of the secular is to limit violence." William T. Cavanaugh writes that what he calls "the myth of religious violence" as a reason for the rise of secular states may be traced to earlier philosophers, such as Spinoza, Hobbes, Locke, Rousseau, and Voltaire. Cavanaugh delivers a detailed critique of this idea in his 2009 book The Myth of Religious Violence: Secular Ideology and the Roots of Modern Conflict.

Secular violence

Janet Jakobsen states that "just as religion and secularism are relationally defined terms - terms that depend on each other - so also the legitimization of violence through either religious or secular discourse is also relational." She states that the idea that "religion kills" is used to legitimate secular violence, and that, similarly, the idea that "secularism kills" is used to legitimate religious violence. According to John Carlson, critics who are skeptical of "religious violence" contend that excessive attention is often paid to acts of religious violence compared to acts of secular violence, and that this leads to a false essentializing of both religion as being prone to violence and the secular as being prone to peace. According to Janet Jakobsen, secularism and modern secular states are much more violent than religion, and modern secular states in particular are usually the source of most of the world's violence. Carlson states that by focusing on the destructive capacity of government, Jakobsen "essentializes another category - the secular state - even as she criticizes secular governments that essentialize religion's violent propensities". Tanner states that secular regimes and leaders have used violence to promote their own agendas. Violence committed by secular governments and people, including the anti-religious, have been documented including violence or persecutions focused on religious believers and those who believe in the supernatural. In the 20th century, estimates state that over 25 million Christians died from secular antireligious violence worldwide.

Religions have been persecuted more in the past 100 years than at any other time in history. According to Geoffrey Blainey, atrocities have occurred under all ideologies, including in nations which were strongly secular such as the Soviet Union, China, and Cambodia. Talal Asad, an anthropologist, states that equating institutional religion with violence and fanaticism is incorrect and that devastating cruelties and atrocities done by non-religious institutions in the 20th century should not be overlooked. He also states that nationalism has been argued as being a secularized religion.

Abrahamic religions

Hector Avalos argues that, because religions claim to have divine favor for themselves, both over and against other groups, this sense of self-righteousness leads to violence because conflicting claims of superiority, based on unverifiable appeals to God, cannot be objectively adjudicated.

Similarly, Eric Hickey writes, "the history of religious violence in the West is as long as the historical record of its three major religions, Judaism, Christianity, and Islam, with their mutual antagonisms and their struggles to adapt and survive despite the secular forces that threaten their continued existence."

Regina Schwartz argues that all monotheistic religions, including Christianity, are inherently violent because of their exclusivism which inevitably fosters violence against those who are considered outsiders. Lawrence Wechsler asserts that Schwartz isn't just arguing that Abrahamic religions have a violent legacy, instead, she is arguing that their legacy is actually genocidal in nature.

Christianity

Before the 11th century, Christians had not developed the doctrine of "Holy war", the belief that fighting itself might be considered a penitential and spiritually meritorious act. Throughout the Middle Ages, force could not be used to propagate religion. For the first three centuries of Christianity, the Church taught the pacifism of Jesus and notable church fathers such as Justin Martyr, Tertullian, Origen, and Cyprian of Carthage even went as far as arguing against joining the military or using any form of violence against aggressors. In the 4th century, St. Augustine developed a "Just War" concept, whereby limited uses of war would be considered acceptable in order to preserve the peace and retain orthodoxy if it was waged: for defensive purposes, ordered by an authority, had honorable intentions, and produced minimal harm. However, the criteria he used was already developed by Roman thinkers in the past and "Augustine's perspective was not based on the New Testament." St. Augustine's "Just War" concept was widely accepted, however, warfare was not regarded as virtuous in any way. Expression of concern for the salvation of those who killed enemies in battle, regardless of the cause for which they fought, was common. In the medieval period which began after the fall of Rome, there were increases in the level of violence due to political instability. By the 11th century, the Church condemned this violence and warring by introducing: the "Peace of God" which prohibited attacks on clergy, pilgrims, townspeople, peasants and property; the "Truce of God" which banned warfare on Sundays, Fridays, Lent, and Easter; and it imposed heavy penances on soldiers for killing and injuring others because it believed that the shedding of other people's blood was the same as shedding the blood of Christ.
         
During the 9th and 10th centuries, multiple invasions occurred in some regions in Europe and these invasions lead them to form their own armies in order to defend themselves and by the 11th century, this slowly lead to the emergence of the Crusades, the concept of "holy war", and terminology such as "enemies of God". By the time of the Crusades, "Despite all the violence during this period, the majority of Christians were not active participants but were more often its victims" and groups  which used nonviolent means to peacefully dialogue with Muslims were established, like the Franciscans.

Today, the relationship between Christianity and violence is the subject of controversy because one view advocates the belief that Christianity advocates peace, love and compassion despite the fact that in certain instances, its adherents have also resorted to violence. Peace, compassion and forgiveness of wrongs done by others are key elements of Christian teaching. However, Christians have struggled since the days of the Church fathers with the question of when the use of force is justified (e.g. the Just war theory of Saint Augustine). Such debates have led to concepts such as just war theory. Throughout history, certain teachings from the Old Testament, the New Testament and Christian theology have been used to justify the use of force against heretics, sinners and external enemies. Heitman and Hagan identify the Inquisitions, Crusades, wars of religion, and antisemitism as being "among the most notorious examples of Christian violence". To this list, Mennonite theologian J. Denny Weaver adds "warrior popes, support of capital punishment, corporal punishment under the guise of 'spare the rod spoil the child,' justifications of slavery, world-wide colonialism under the guise of converting people to Christianity, the systemic violence against women who are subjected to the rule of men." Weaver employs a broader definition of violence that extends the meaning of the word to cover "harm or damage", not just physical violence per se. Thus, under his definition, Christian violence includes "forms of systemic violence such as poverty, racism, and sexism".

Christian theologians point to a strong doctrinal and historical imperative against violence that exists within Christianity, particularly Jesus' Sermon on the Mount, which taught nonviolence and "love of enemies". For example, Weaver asserts that Jesus' pacifism was "preserved in the justifiable war doctrine which declares that all war is sin even when it is occasionally declared to be a necessary evil, and in the prohibition of fighting by monastics and clergy as well as in a persistent tradition of Christian pacifism".

Many authors highlight the ironical contradiction between Christianity's claims to be centered on "love and peace" while, at the same time, harboring a "violent side". For example, Mark Juergensmeyer argues: "that despite its central tenets of love and peace, Christianity—like most traditions—has always had a violent side. The bloody history of the tradition has provided images as disturbing as those provided by Islam, and violent conflict is vividly portrayed in the Bible. This history and these biblical images have provided the raw material for theologically justifying the violence of contemporary Christian groups. For example, attacks on abortion clinics have been viewed not only as assaults on a practice that Christians regard as immoral, but also as skirmishes in a grand confrontation between forces of evil and good that has social and political implications.", sometimes referred to as spiritual warfare. The statement attributed to Jesus "I come not to bring peace, but to bring a sword" has been interpreted by some as a call to arms to Christians.

Maurice Bloch also argues that the Christian faith fosters violence because the Christian faith is a religion, and religions are violent by their very nature; moreover, he argues that religion and politics are two sides of the same coin—power. Others have argued that religion and the exercise of force are deeply intertwined, but they have also stated that religion may pacify, as well as channel and heighten violent impulses 

In response to the view that Christianity and violence are intertwined, Miroslav Volf and J. Denny Weaver reject charges that Christianity is a violent religion, arguing that certain aspects of Christianity might be misused to support violence but that a genuine interpretation of its core elements would not sanction human violence but would instead resist it. Among the examples that are commonly used to argue that Christianity is a violent religion, J. Denny Weaver lists "(the) Crusades, the multiple blessings of wars, warrior popes, support of capital punishment, corporal punishment under the guise of 'spare the rod and spoil the child,' justifications of slavery, world-wide colonialism in the name of converting people to Christianity, the systemic violence against women who are subjected to the rule of men." Weaver characterizes the counter-argument as focusing on "Jesus, the beginning point of Christian faith,... whose Sermon on the Mount taught nonviolence and love of enemies,; who nonviolently faced his death at the hands of his accusers; whose nonviolent teaching inspired the first centuries of pacifist Christian history and was subsequently preserved in the justifiable war doctrine that declares that all war is sin even when it is occasionally declared to be a necessary evil, and in the prohibition of fighting by monastics and clergy as well as in a persistent tradition of Christian pacifism."

Miroslav Volf acknowledges the fact that "many contemporaries see religion as a pernicious social ill that needs aggressive treatment rather than medicine from which a cure is expected." However, Volf contests the claim that "(the) Christian faith, as one of the major world religions, predominantly fosters violence." Instead of this negative assessment, Volf argues that Christianity "should be seen as a contributor to more peaceful social environments." Volf examines the question of whether or not Christianity fosters violence, and he has identified four main arguments which claim that it does: that religion by its nature is violent, which occurs when people try to act as "soldiers of God"; that monotheism entails violence, because a claim of universal truth divides people into "us versus them"; that creation, as in the Book of Genesis, is an act of violence; and the argument that the intervention of a "new creation", as in the Second Coming, generates violence. Writing about the latter, Volf says: "Beginning at least with Constantine's conversion, the followers of the Crucified have perpetrated gruesome acts of violence under the sign of the cross. Over the centuries, the seasons of Lent and Holy Week were, for the Jews, times of fear and trepidation; Christians have perpetrated some of the worst pogroms as they remembered the crucifixion of Christ, for which they blamed the Jews. Muslims also associate the cross with violence; crusaders' rampages were undertaken under the sign of the cross." In each case, Volf concluded that the Christian faith was misused in order to justify violence. Volf argues that "thin" readings of Christianity might be used mischievously to support the use of violence. He counters, however, by asserting that "thick" readings of Christianity's core elements will not sanction human violence, instead, they will resist it.

Volf asserts that Christian churches suffer from a "confusion of loyalties". He asserts that "rather than the character of the Christian faith itself, a better explanation as to why Christian churches are either impotent in the face of violent conflicts or are active participants in them is derived from the proclivities of its adherents which are at odds with the character of the Christian faith." Volf observes that "(although) they are explicitly giving ultimate allegiance to the Gospel of Jesus Christ, many Christians in fact seem to have an overriding commitment to their respective cultures and ethnic groups."

The Church of Jesus Christ of Latter-day Saints

The Church of Jesus Christ of Latter-day Saints has an early history of violence. It was motivated by Anti-Mormonism and began with the religious persecution of the Church by well respected citizens, law enforcement, and government officials. Ultimately, this persecution lead to several historically well-known acts of violence. These ranged from attacks on early members, such as the Haun's Mill massacre following the Mormon Extermination Order to one of the most controversial and well-known cases of retaliation violence, the Mountain Meadows massacre. This was the result of an unprovoked response to religious persecution whereby an innocent party which was traveling through Church occupied territory was attacked on 11 September 1857.

Islam

Islam has been associated with violence in a variety of contexts, especially in the context of Jihad. In Arabic, the word jihād translates into English as "struggle". Jihad appears in the Qur'an and frequently in the idiomatic expression "striving in the way of Allah (al-jihad fi sabil Allah)". The context of the word can be seen in its usage in Arabic translations of the New Testament such as in 2 Timothy 4:7 where St. Paul expresses keeping the faith after many struggles. A person engaged in jihad is called a mujahid; the plural is mujahideen. Jihad is an important religious duty for Muslims. A minority among the Sunni scholars sometimes refer to this duty as the sixth pillar of Islam, though it occupies no such official status. In Twelver Shi'a Islam, however, Jihad is one of the ten Practices of the Religion.
For some the Quran seem to endorse unequivocally to violence. On the other hand, some scholars argue that such verses of the Quran are interpreted out of context.

According to a study from Gallup, most Muslims understand the word "Jihad" to mean individual struggle, not something violent or militaristic. Muslims use the word in a religious context to refer to three types of struggles: an internal struggle to maintain faith, the struggle to improve the Muslim society, or the struggle in a holy war. The prominent British orientalist Bernard Lewis argues that in the Qur'an and the hadith jihad implies warfare in the large majority of cases. In a commentary of the hadith Sahih Muslim, entitled al-Minhaj, the medieval Islamic scholar Yahya ibn Sharaf al-Nawawi stated that "one of the collective duties of the community as a whole is to lodge a valid protest, to solve problems of religion, to have knowledge of Divine Law, to command what is right and forbid wrong conduct".

According to Irfan Omar,  Islam has a history of nonviolence and negotiation when dealing with conflicts: for instance, early Muslims experienced 83 conflicts with non-Muslims and only 4 of these ended up in armed conflict.

Terrorism and Islam 

In western societies the term jihad is often translated as "holy war". Scholars of Islamic studies often stress the fact that these two terms are not synonymous. Muslim authors, in particular, tend to reject such an approach, stressing the non-militant connotations of the word.

Islamic terrorism refers to terrorism that is engaged in by Muslim groups  or individuals who are motivated by either politics, religion or both.  Terrorist acts have included airline hijacking, kidnapping, assassination, suicide bombing, and mass murder.

The tension reached a climax on 11 September 2001 when Islamic terrorists flew hijacked commercial airplanes into the World Trade Center in New York City and the Pentagon in Washington, D.C. The "War on Terror" has triggered anti-Muslim sentiments within most western countries and throughout the rest of the world. Al-Qaeda is one of the most well-known Islamic extremist groups, created by Osama bin Mohammed bin Awad bin Laden. Al-Qaeda's goal is to spread the "purest" form of Islam and Islamic law. Based on his interpretation of the Quran, bin Laden needed to do "good" by inflicting terror upon millions of people. Following the terrorist attacks on 11 September, bin Laden praised the suicide bombers in his statement: "the great action you did which was first and foremost by the grace of Allah. This is the guidance of Allah and the blessed fruit of jihad." In contrast, echoing the overwhelming majority of people who interpreted these events, President Bush said on 11 September, "Freedom itself was attacked this morning by a faceless coward. ... And freedom will be defended. Make no mistake, the United States will hunt down and punish those responsible for these cowardly acts." 

Controversies surrounding the subject include disagreements over whether terrorist acts are self-defense or aggression, national self-determination or Islamic supremacy; whether Islam can ever condone the targeting of non-combatants; whether some attacks described as Islamic terrorism are merely terrorist acts committed by Muslims or terrorist acts motivated by nationalism; whether Wahhabism are at the root of Islamic terrorism, or simply one cause of it; how much support for Islamic terrorism exists in the Muslim world and whether support of terrorism is only a temporary phenomenon, a "bubble", now fading away.

Judaism

As the religion of the Jews, who are also known as Israelites, Judaism is based on the Torah and the Tanakh, which is also referred to as the Hebrew Bible, and it guides its adherents on how to live, die, and fight via the 613 commandments which are referred to as the 613 Mitzvahs, the most famous of which are the Ten Commandments, one of which is the commandment You shall not murder.

The Torah also lists instances and circumstances which require its adherents to go to war and kill their enemies. Such a war is usually referred to as a Milkhemet Mitzvah, a "compulsory war" which is obligated by the Torah or God, or a Milkhemet Reshut a "voluntary war".

Criticism

Burggraeve and Vervenne describe the Old Testament as being full of violence and they also cite it as evidence for the existence of both a violent society and a violent god. They write that, "(i)n numerous Old Testament texts the power and glory of Israel's God is described in the language of violence." They assert that more than one thousand passages refer to Yahweh as acting violently or supporting the violence of humans and they also assert that more than one hundred passages involve divine commands to kill humans.

On the basis of these passages in the Old Testament, some Christian churches and theologians argue that Judaism is a violent religion and the god of Israel is a violent god. Reuven Firestone asserts that these assertions are usually made in the context of claims that Christianity is a religion of peace and the god of Christianity is one who only expresses love.

Other views

Some scholars such as Deborah Weissman readily acknowledge the fact that "normative Judaism is not pacifist" and "violence is condoned in the service of self-defense."However, the Talmud prohibits violence of any kind towards one's neighbour. J. Patout Burns asserts that, although Judaism condones the use of violence in certain cases, Jewish tradition clearly posits the principle of minimization of violence. This principle can be stated as "(wherever) Jewish law allows violence to keep an evil from occurring, it mandates that the minimal amount of violence must be used in order to accomplish one's goal."

The love and pursuit of peace, as well as laws which require the eradication of evil, sometimes by the use of violent means, co-exist in the Jewish tradition.

Examples include the story
of the Amalekites, the story of the Midianites, and the battle of Jericho .

Judging biblical wars

The biblical wars of extermination have been characterized as "genocide" by several authorities, because the Torah states that the Israelites annihilated entire ethnic groups or tribes: the Israelites killed all Amalekites, including men, women, and children (1 Samuel 15:1–20); the Israelites killed all men, women, and children in the battle of Jericho(Joshua 6:15–21), and the Israelites killed all men, women and children of several Canaanite tribes (Joshua 10:28–42). However, some scholars believe that these accounts in the Torah are exaggerated or metaphorical.

Arab-Israeli conflict

During the Palestine-Israeli conflict, people use the Torah (Tanakh) as a way to murder Palestinians, but the IDF has said "That we don't condone the killing of innocent Palestinians".

Palestinians as "Amalekites"

On several occasions, Palestinians have been associated with biblical antagonists, particularly with the Amalekites. For example, Rabbi Israel Hess has recommended that Palestinians be killed, based on biblical verses such as 1 Samuel 15.

Other religions

Buddhism

Hinduism

Neo-paganism 
In the United States and Europe, neo-pagan beliefs have been associated with many terrorist incidents. Although the majority of neo-pagans oppose violence and racism, folkish factions of Odinism, Wotanism, and Ásatrú emphasize their Nordic cultural heritage and idolize warriors. For these reasons, a 1999 Federal Bureau of Investigation report on domestic terrorism which was titled Project Megiddo described Odinism as “[lending] itself to violence and [having] the potential to inspire its followers to violence.” As of 2017, the Southern Poverty Law Center has recognized at least two active neo-pagan hate groups in the United States. Many white supremacists (especially those in prison) are converting to Odinism at increasing rates, citing the impurity of Christianity and the failure of previous groups to accomplish goals as the primary reasons for their conversion. Similarities between Odinism and other extremist groups such as Christian Identity facilitate conversions. The targets of neo-pagan violence are similar to those of white supremacist terrorists and nationalist terrorists, but an added target includes Christians and churches.

Sikhism

Notable incidents
 Murder of Alan Berg — Defunct American white supremacist group the Order was founded by avid practitioners of Wotanism such as David Lane and Robert Jay Mathews. Lane was convicted of the 1984 murder of Jewish radio host Alan Berg. 
 Church burnings — A wave of church burnings, such as during the early Norwegian black metal scene in the 1990s, has been cited as an act of neo-pagan terrorism. The arsons coincided with a resurgence in the popularity of European black metal. This genre of music featured the imagery and ideas of neo-paganism, Satanism, and nationalism. The targets were Christian churches, and up to 28 churches were targeted during this period. Popular black metal musician Varg Vikernes, a noted neo-pagan and nationalist, was convicted of three of these arsons and charged with a fourth attempt.
 Overland Park Jewish Community Center shooting — Frazier Glenn Miller Jr. shot and killed three people at a Kansas Jewish community center in 2014. Prior to becoming an Odinist, Miller Jr. was a member of the Ku Klux Klan.

Conflicts and wars

Some authors have stated that "religious" conflicts are not exclusively based on religious beliefs but should instead be seen as clashes of communities, identities, and interests that are secular-religious or at least very secular.

Some have asserted that attacks are carried out by those with very strong religious convictions such as terrorists in the context of a global religious war. Robert Pape, a political scientist who specializes in suicide terrorism argues that much of the modern Muslim suicide terrorism is secularly based. Although the causes of terrorism are complex, it may be safe to assume that terrorists are partially reassured by their religious views that their god is on their side and that it will reward them in Heaven for punishing unbelievers.

These conflicts are among the most difficult to resolve, particularly when both sides believe that God is on their side and that He has endorsed the moral righteousness of their claims. One of the most infamous quotes which is associated with religious fanaticism was uttered in 1209 during the siege of Béziers, a Crusader asked the Papal Legate Arnaud Amalric how to tell Catholics from Cathars when the city was taken, to which Amalric replied:
"Caedite eos. Novit enim Dominus qui sunt eius", or "Kill them all; God will recognize his."

Ritual violence

Ritual violence may be directed against victims (e.g., human and nonhuman animal sacrifice and ritual slaughter) or self-inflicted (religious self-flagellation).

According to the hunting hypothesis, created by Walter Burkert in Homo Necans, carnivorous behavior is considered a form of violence. Burkett suggests that the anthropological phenomenon of religion grew out of rituals that were connected with hunting and the associated feelings of guilt over the violence that hunting required.

See also

Al-Qaeda
Antireligion
Blood atonement
Blood libel
Boko Haram
Christian fascism
Christian fundamentalism
Christian Identity
Christian Patriot movement
Clerical fascism
Criticism of religion
Cult
Fundamentalism
Hundred Years' War
International Day Commemorating the Victims of Acts of Violence Based on Religion or Belief
Islamic fundamentalism
Islamic State
Islamism
Islamofascism
Jewish fundamentalism
Kahanism
Mormon fundamentalism
Pacifism and religion
Peace in Islamic philosophy
Persecution of Christians
Persecution of Christians by Christians
Religion and peacebuilding
Religions for Peace
Religious discrimination
Religious discrimination in Pakistan
Religious fanaticism
Religious intolerance
Religious persecution
Religious segregation
Religious terrorism
Religious violence in India
Religious violence in Nigeria
Religious war
Sect
Sectarian violence
Sectarian violence among Christians
Taiping Rebellion
Taliban
Witch-hunt

References

Further reading
Academic
Appleby, R. Scott (2000) The Ambivalence of the Sacred: Religion, Violence, and Reconciliation. Lanham, MD: Rowman & Littlefield Publishers.
Avalos, Hector (2005) Fighting Words: the Origins of Religious Violence. New York: Prometheus.
 Buc, Philippe (2015) Holy War, Martyrdom and Terror: Christianity, Violence and the West. Philadelphia: University of Pennsylvania Press.
Burkert, Walter. (1983). Homo Necans: The Anthropology of Ancient Greek Sacrificial Ritual and Myth. Berkeley: University of California Press
Crocket, Clayton (ed.) (2006) Religion and Violence in a Secular World: Toward a New Political Theology. Charlottesville: University of Virginia Press.
Flood, Derek (2012) "The way of peace and grace". Sojourners. January 2012. 
Girard, René. (1977) Violence et le Sacré (English Violence and the Sacred). Baltimore: Johns Hopkins University Press.
Hamerton-Kelly, Robert G. (ed.) (1987) Violent Origins: Walter Burkert, René Girard and Jonathan Z. Smith on Ritual Killing and Cultural Formation. Stanford: Stanford University Press.
Jerryson, Michael. (2010) Buddhist Warfare. New York: Oxford University Press.
Juergensmeyer, Mark, Kitts, Margo and Jerryson, Michael (ed.) (2013) The Oxford Handbook of Religion and Violence. New York: Oxford University Press.
Juergensmeyer, Mark; Kitts, Margo; Jerryson, Michael (ed.) (2016) Violence and the World's Religious Traditions: An Introduction. New York: Oxford University Press.
Juergensmeyer, Mark. (2000) Terror in the Mind of God: The Global Rise of Religious Violence. Berkeley: University of California Press.
Kitts, Margo (2018) Elements of Ritual and Violence. Cambridge, U.K.: Cambridge University Press.
Kitts, Margo (ed.) (2013–present) Journal of Religion and Violence, Charlottesville: Philosophy Documentation Center. 
Kitts, Margo (ed.) (2018) Martyrdom, Self-Sacrifice, and Self-Immolation:  Religious Perspectives on Suicide. New York: Oxford University Press. 
 
Pedahzur, Ami and Weinberg, Leonard (eds.) (2004) Religious Fundamentalism and Political Extremism. New York: Routledge.

Selengut, C. (2003) Sacred Fury: Understanding Religious Violence. Walnut Creek, CA: Altamira
 
Steffen, Lloyd. (2007) Holy War, Just War: Exploring the Moral Meaning of Religious Violence. Lanham, MD: Rowman & Littlefield Publishers.
Other
Nelson-Pallmeyer, Jack (2003) Is Religion Killing Us? Harrisburg: Trinity Press International 

Stern, Jessica. (2004) Terror in the Name of God: Why Religious Militants Kill. New York: Harper Perennial.

External links
 Myth of Religious conflict in Africa
 William T. Cavanaugh Resources from Jesus Radicals

 
Dispute resolution